Entre Monjas Anda el Diablo is a 1973 Mexican musical comedy film directed by René Cardona, and starring Vicente Fernández, Angélica María, Sara García and Alma Rosa Aguirre, in her final film role.

References

External links
 

1973 films
1970s Spanish-language films
1970s musical comedy films
Films directed by René Cardona
1973 comedy films
Mexican musical comedy films
1970s Mexican films